Tosin Oyelese (born 14 May 1991) is an English professional basketball player who started his career playing for the Essex Leopards of the English Basketball League. From 2017 to 2020 he was a forward in Westminster Warriors.

References

1991 births
Living people
English men's basketball players